Hyllisia flavovittata is a species of beetle in the family Cerambycidae. It was described by Breuning in 1961.

References

flavovittata
Beetles described in 1961
Taxa named by Stephan von Breuning (entomologist)